Senecio pygmaeus, the pygmy ragwort, is a species of plant in the Asteraceae family. It is sub-endemic to Malta, it also found in Sicily, Lampedusa, Pantelleria, and other islands.

References 

pygmaeus
Taxa named by Friedrich von Berchtold
Taxa named by Jan Svatopluk Presl
Flora of Malta